The , also known as the Nikyō Incident was a failed attempt to overthrow the Meiji government in early 1868  during the early Meiji period in Japan. The incident was part of a larger movement of anti-government uprisings, which sought to implement the policy of sonnō jōi (revere the emperor, expel the barbarians), a principle that the newly established Meiji government had not yet adopted.

The main conspirators of the Two Lords Incident were two government officials, Otagi Michiteru and Toyama Mitsusuke. However, it is believed that behind the scenes, supporters of the sonnō jōi movement were coordinating and collaborating with various dissenting groups. The movement was driven by individual motivations, and the wide-spread nature of the movement led to the capture of key members before the rebellion could take place. The incident resulted in many arrests in places such as Akita, Tokyo, Kyoto, and Kurume.

Despite the historical significance of the Two Lords Incident, it is neither  well-known nor widely studied. Famous samurai, Katsura Kogorō, also knew of this plan and reflected later, "I thought the Northeast Alliance would last at least two years." Kurume had a history as a center of loyalty to the emperor, being the place of death of the loyalist samurai, Takayama Hikokurō, and the home of the loyalist, Makoto Magaki, but during the late Edo period, a supporter of the shogunate, Miwasa Fuwa, became a political leader and his vassal, Imai Ei, promoted modernization within the domain. However, with the Meiji Restoration, in January 1868 (Keio 4), Fuwa was assassinated by supporters of the sonnō jōi movement and the following year, the new Meiji government dissolved the domains and created prefectures. The Boshin War began soon after and led to the Meiji Restoration.

References 

Rebellions in Japan
Conflicts in 1868